The 110th Rifle Division was a formation of the Soviet Union's Red Army during the course of World War II, which was formed, dissolved, and re-formed three times throughout the war.

History

First formation
The division was first formed 20 September 1939 at Sverdlovsk in the Urals Military District. Its primary order of battle included:
 394th, 411th, 425th Rifle Regiments
 355th Light Artillery Regiment
 457th Antiaircraft Battalion
Mobilized before the beginning of Operation Barbarossa, by June 1941 the division formed part of the 61st Rifle Corps in the 20th Army, in the Reserve of the Supreme High Command (Stavka Reserve) around Moscow, the 20th Army occupying a defensive position around Kaluga. The division was destroyed with its corps during the Siege of Mogilev in July 1941. The division was officially disbanded on 19 September 1941.

Second formation
On 4 September 1941, the 4th Moscow People's Militia Rifle Division, which had originally been raised in the Kuibyshev district of Moscow in July 1941, was renumbered as the new 110th Rifle Division, beginning its second formation.

Its composition changed to regular army subunits to include:
 1287th, 1289th, 1291st Rifle Regiments
 971st Artillery Regiment
 695th Antiaircraft Battalion
 470th Reconnaissance Company
 859th Signal Battalion
 493rd Medical/Sanitation Battalion
 332nd Chemical Defence Company
 329th Auto-transport Company
It was assigned as part of the 24th, 49th, 21st, and 33rd Armies, participating in the defensive and offensive operations around Moscow – Operation Mars at the end of 1942 as part of the Red Army's Kalinin Front, and later in 1943 the Rzhev-Vyazma offensives, and the Orel offensive operation (Operation Kutuzov), after the Battle of Kursk. From the Rzhev battles to October 1944, the division was commanded by Major General Georgy Borisovich Peters, its former deputy commander.

On 10 April 1943, the 110th Rifle Division was renamed the 84th Guards Rifle Division.

Third formation
The third formation of the division was on 5 May 1943, with the same unit numbers as the second formation. On 6 April 1945, commanded by Colonel Sergey Mikhailovich Tarasov, it participated in the encirclement of Königsberg, located at the northern sector. In that assault, the division was accompanied by its two sister divisions of 69th Rifle Corps, 50th Army: the 153rd Rifle Division, on its right flank, and the 324th Rifle Division on its left flank.

The division moved to the Kharkov Military District in Luhansk Oblast postwar and was disbanded with the corps on or around 6 May 1946.

See also
 List of infantry divisions of the Soviet Union 1917–1957

References

Sources
 
 Glantz, David M., Stumbling Colossus: The Red Army of the eve of World War. University Press of Kansas, Lawrence, Kansas, 1998. 
 Generals.dk General Major Georgii Borisovich Peters (1897–1978) was the deputy commander and later commanding officer of 110th Rifle Division in 1942-44, including after its renaming as the 84th Guards Koracheyev Rifle Division.
 Bonn, Keith E., Slaughterhouse: The Handbook of the Eastern Front, Aberjona Press, Bedford PA, 2005
 Grylev, A., Gen. Maj., Perecheni No.5 of the General Staff: Rifle, mountain, motor-rifle and motorised divisions included in the active army during the years of the Great Patriotic War 1941-1945, Military-scientific directorate of the General Staff, Moscow, 1970, via www.soldat.ru, Perechen, verified 4 June 2008.
 pp. 152-53

110